Les Johns (born 1942 in Newcastle, New South Wales) is a former Australian professional rugby league footballer who played in the 1960s and early 1970s.

Club career
Les Johns started his career at Newcastle's Souths club.
 
He then played nine seasons for the Canterbury-Bankstown club between 1963–1971. He scored 14 tries and 233 goals and 19 field goals for Canterbury-Bankstown during his career.

He has been named among the nation's finest footballers of the 20th century. He was a fullback of considerable flair and on his day could be one of the most brilliant attacking and defensive players in the game.

He was forced to retire from rugby league in 1971 due to chronic knee injuries.

Representative career

Johns played sixteen games for the New South Wales rugby league team between 1962–1969. He represented Australia on fourteen occasions between 1963–1969, first touring with the 1963/64 Kangaroos.

He is listed on the Australian Players Register as Kangaroo No.382.

Accolades
In February 2008, Johns was named in the list of Australia's 100 Greatest Players (1908–2007) which was commissioned by the NRL and ARL to
celebrate the code's centenary year in Australia.

He was made a life member of the Canterbury-Bankstown Bulldogs in 2011.

In 2010 Johns was also named in a South Newcastle team of the century.

Footnotes

1942 births
Living people
Australia national rugby league team players
Australian rugby league coaches
Australian rugby league players
Canterbury-Bankstown Bulldogs players
Clive Churchill Medal winners
New South Wales rugby league team players
Rugby league fullbacks
Rugby league players from Newcastle, New South Wales
South Newcastle Lions players